Deportivo Teculután  is a Guatemalan football club based in Teculután, Zacapa Department.

They play their home games in the Estadio Julio Héctor Paz Castilla.

History 
They have been playing in Guatemala's second division since 2004, after they spent 3 seasons at the highest domestic level.

Current squad

References 

Football clubs in Guatemala